The Hoople is the seventh studio album by British rock band Mott the Hoople. The album peaked in the UK Albums Chart at No. 11, whilst its highest chart rating in the US was No. 28. A remastered and expanded version was released by Sony BMG on the Columbia Legacy label in Europe in 2006.  It was the only album to feature guitarist Ariel Bender (who replaced Mick Ralphs following his departure to form Bad Company), and the last album to feature vocalist Ian Hunter before his departure for a solo career.

The album's cover features a stylised portrait of Kari-Ann Muller (with the band members in her hair), who also graces the cover of Roxy Music's 1972 debut album.

Track listing
All tracks written by Ian Hunter except where noted.

Side one
 "The Golden Age of Rock 'n' Roll" – 3:26
 "Marionette" – 5:08
 "Alice" – 5:20
 "Crash Street Kidds" – 4:31

Side two
  "Born Late '58" (Overend Watts) – 4:00
 “Trudi's Song" – 4:26
 "Pearl 'n' Roy (England)" – 4:31
 "Through the Looking Glass" – 4:37
 "Roll Away the Stone" – 3:10

Bonus tracks on 2006 CD reissue
  "Where Do You All Come From" (Dale "Buffin" Griffin, Hunter, Mick Ralphs, Peter Watts) – 3:26 B-side of "Roll Away the Stone" single.
 "Rest in Peace" – 3:55 B-side of "The Golden Age of Rock 'n' Roll" single.
 "Foxy, Foxy" – 3:31 Non-LP single A-side.
 "(Do You Remember) The Saturday Gigs" – 4:20 Non-LP single A-side.
 "The Saturday Kids" – 6:03 (Work in progress mixes)
 "Lounge Lizzard" – 4:19 (Aborted single b-side)
 "American Pie/The Golden Age of Rock 'n' Roll" (Don McLean, Hunter) (Live) – 4:15 (Live from Broadway)

Personnel
Mott the Hoople
Ian Hunter – vocals, rhythm guitar, piano
Pete Overend Watts – bass guitar, vocals, lead vocals on "Born Late '58", rhythm guitar, 12-string guitar
Dale "Buffin" Griffin – drums, vocals, percussion
Ariel Bender – lead guitar, vocals, slide guitar
Morgan Fisher – keyboards, synthesizer
Additional personnel
Howie Casey – tenor saxophone on 1 2 3 7
Jock McPherson – baritone saxophone on 1 2 7, tenor saxophone on 1 2 7
Mike Hurwitz – cello on 2
Lynsey De Paul – backing vocals on 3 9
Mick Ralphs – backing vocals on 7, rhythm guitar on 9
 – violin on 8, conductor on 8, tubular bells on 8
Barry St. John, Sue and Sunny – backing vocals on 1 8
Thunderthighs (Karen Friedman, Dari Lalou & Casey Synge) – backing vocals on 9
Technical 
Dan Loggins – production supervisor
Mike Dunne, Paul Hardiman – engineer (Advision Studios)
Bill Price, Gary Edwards, Peter Swettenham, Sean Milligan – engineer (Air Studios)
 Roslav Szaybo – sleeve concept, design
John Brown – photography

Charts
Album

Singles

Certifications

References

Mott the Hoople albums
1974 albums
Columbia Records albums